The 1990 All-SEC football team consists of American football players selected to the All-Southeastern Conference (SEC) chosen by various selectors for the 1990 NCAA Division I-A football season. The Florida Gators posted the best conference record, but were ineligible for an SEC title due to NCAA probation. Thus the Tennessee Volunteers won the conference. Florida quarterback Shane Matthews was voted SEC Player of the Year.

Offensive selections

Receivers 
Carl Pickens, Tennessee (C, AP-1, UPI)
Todd Kinchen, LSU (C, AP-1)
Ernie Mills, Florida (AP-2, UPI)
Alvin Harper, Tennessee (AP-2)

Tight ends 
 Kirk Kirkpatrick, Florida (C, AP-1)
 Rodney Jackson, Kentucky (AP-2)
 Lamonde Russell, Alabama (AP-2)

Tackles
Antone Davis, Tennessee (C, AP-1, UPI)
Terrill Chatman, Alabama (C, AP-2, UPI)
Rob Selby, Auburn (C, AP-1)
Charles McRae, Tennessee (C, AP-2)
Cal Dixon, Florida (UPI)

Guards 
Ed King, Auburn (C, AP-1, UPI)
Ricky Byrd, Miss. St. (AP-1)
Chris Bromley, Florida (AP-2)
Joel Mazzella, Kentucky (AP-2)

Centers 
Roger Shultz, Alabama (C, AP-1, UPI)
Blake Miller, LSU (C, AP-2)
Kevin Brothen, Vanderbilt (AP-2)

Quarterbacks 

 Shane Matthews, Florida (C, AP-1, UPI)
 Andy Kelly, Tennessee (AP-2)

Running backs 

 Tony Thompson, Tennessee (C, AP-1, UPI)
Randy Baldwin, Ole Miss (C, AP-1, UPI)
Harvey Williams, LSU (AP-2, UPI)
Al Baker, Kentucky (AP-2)

Defensive selections

Defensive linemen 
George Thornton, Alabama (C, AP-1, UPI)
David Rocker, Auburn (C, AP-1, UPI)
Kelvin Pritchett, Ole Miss (C, AP-1)
Marc Boutte, LSU (AP-2, UPI)
Mark Murray, Florida (AP-2)
Rod Keith, Vanderbilt (AP-2)
Robert Stewart, Alabama (AP-2)
Brad Culpepper, Florida (AP-2)
Walter Tate, Auburn (AP-2)

Linebackers 
Huey Richardson, Florida (C, AP-1 [as DL], UPI)
John Sullins, Alabama (C, AP-1, UPI)
Randy Holleran, Kentucky (C, AP-1)
Godfrey Myles, Florida (C, AP-2)
Tim Paulk, Florida (AP-2, UPI)
Reggie Stewart, Miss. St. (AP-1)
Morris Lewis, Georgia (AP-2)
Earnest Fields, Tennessee (AP-2)

Backs 
Will White, Florida (C, AP-1, UPI)
Dale Carter, Tennessee (C, AP-1, UPI)
Efrum Thomas, Alabama (C, AP-1, UPI)
Richard Fain, Florida (C, AP-1)
John Wiley, Auburn (AP-2, UPI)
Chris Mitchell, Ole Miss (AP-1)
Corey Barlow, Auburn (AP-2)
D. McCorvey, LSU (AP-2)

Special teams

Kicker 
Philip Doyle, Alabama (C, AP-1, UPI)
John Kasay, Georgia (AP-2)

Punter 

 David Lawrence, Vanderbilt (C, AP-1)
Joey Chapman, Tennessee (UPI)
Mike Riley, Miss. St. (AP-2)

Key
C = selected by coaches of the conference

AP = Associated Press

UPI = United Press International

Bold = Consensus first-team selection by Coaches, AP, and UPI

See also
1990 College Football All-America Team

References

All-SEC
All-SEC football teams